Umurlu is a town in the central district of Aydın Province, Turkey. The population of the town was 11,368 as of 2012.

References

Populated places in Aydın Province
Towns in Turkey
Efeler District